Taconic Mountains Ramble State Park is a state park near Hubbardton, Vermont. It is a day-use park within the northern Taconic Mountains, near the Hubbardton Battlefield Historic Site.

The  holdings of the park were bequeathed in 2016 to the State of Vermont under a trust in the name of the late filmmaker Carson Davidson. The trust also funds continuing repairs and maintenance of the park.

Facilities and setting
A one-story modular building near a small parking area has maps and park information posted. The park contains a Japanese garden left by Davidson, which is near the parking area. In 2017, it still had a hay field in operation. Taconic Ramble features trails through woods and waterfalls.

References

State parks of Vermont
Protected areas of Rutland County, Vermont
Hubbardton, Vermont
Protected areas established in 2016
2016 establishments in Vermont